Local elections were held in Cape Verde on 4 September 2016. They were a landslide victory for the Movement for Democracy (MpD), that won 18 out of 22 municipalities (13 in 2012). The African Party for the Independence of Cape Verde (PAICV) won 2 municipalities (8 in 2012).

Results

Municipal chamber results
The final results are:

Municipal assembly results
The final results are:

References

2016 in Cape Verde
2016
2016 elections in Africa